The Democratic Republic of the Congo made its Paralympic Games début at the 2012 Summer Paralympics in London, United Kingdom, from August 29 to September 9.

The country was represented by two athletes, both in track and field: Levy Kitambala Kizito in the javelin and discus and Dedeline Mibamba Kimbata, in the 100 metres and discus.

Athletics 

Men’s Field Events

Women’s Track and Road Events

Women’s Field Events

See also
Summer Paralympic disability classification
Democratic Republic of the Congo at the Paralympics
Democratic Republic of the Congo at the 2012 Summer Olympics

Notes

Nations at the 2012 Summer Paralympics
2012
Para